The Mount Jefferson Wilderness is a wilderness area located on and around Mount Jefferson in the central Cascade Range of Oregon in the United States. The wilderness lies within the Willamette National Forest and Deschutes National Forest. It also has  of trails, including  of the Pacific Crest National Scenic Trail. Three Fingered Jack and Mount Jefferson are both prominent features of the wilderness area. Mount Jefferson Wilderness is the second most visited Oregon wilderness area after the Three Sisters Wilderness.

Geography 

At , Mount Jefferson is the second tallest mountain in Oregon.  It is a stratovolcano with slopes mantled by five glaciers - Whitewater, Waldo, Milk Creek, Russell, and Jefferson Park.  Three Fingered Jack is a heavily eroded and deeply glaciated shield volcano and consists mainly of basaltic andesite lava.  At , it is made up of the solidified lava plug flanked by ridges of the old volcano's subsidiary lava dikes and lies at the southern end of the Mount Jefferson Wilderness.  Other geographic features of the wilderness include steep talus slopes, rock outcrops, and alpine meadows.

Several lakes are situated within the wilderness area, including Marion Lake, Duffy Lake, Santiam Lake and Wasco Lake.

Vegetation
Vegetation in Mount Jefferson Wilderness is predominantly Douglas-fir, Pacific silver fir, sub-alpine fir, mountain hemlock, lodgepole pine, ponderosa pine, several species of false cedars including, Alaska-cedar, incense cedar, and western redcedar as well as species such as vine maple, huckleberry and rhododendron.  Lupine, red paintbrush, bear grass, and various species of lily are also common in the wilderness.

Wildlife
Common wildlife found in Mount Jefferson Wilderness include deer, black bear, coyotes, and bald eagles. The Wilderness also includes Marion Lake, which is a breeding location for amphibians such as the rough-skinned newt. Roughly half the lakes in the Mount Jefferson Wilderness area contain rainbow trout.

Recreation
Common recreational activities in Mount Jefferson Wilderness include hiking, backpacking, camping, cross-country skiing, wildlife watching, and mountain climbing on Mount Jefferson and Three Fingered Jack.

See also 
 List of Oregon Wildernesses
Camp Pioneer
Whitewater Fire

References 

Cascade Range
IUCN Category Ib
Protected areas of Jefferson County, Oregon
Protected areas of Linn County, Oregon
Protected areas of Marion County, Oregon
Old-growth forests
Wilderness areas of Oregon
Willamette National Forest
Deschutes National Forest
Mount Hood National Forest
1968 establishments in Oregon
Protected areas established in 1968